Roberto Poggiali (born  16 April 1941) is a retired Italian road racing cyclist. As an amateur he won the national road championship and one stage of the Tour de l'Avenir in 1962. He then turned professional and won the 1970 Tour de Suisse. He also rode the Giro d'Italia in 1963–74 and 1976–78, with the best result of eighth place in 1965, and Tour de France in 1967, 1969 and 1975, finishing 22nd in 1975.

References

1941 births
Living people
Italian male cyclists
Cyclists from Florence